The Buffalo Bisons were an American Hockey League ice hockey franchise that played from 1940 to 1970 in Buffalo, New York. They replaced the original Buffalo Bisons hockey team, which left the area in 1936 after its arena collapsed. They were the second professional hockey team to play their games in the Buffalo city proper, after the short-lived Buffalo Majors of the early 1930s; the previous Bisons team had played across the border at an arena in Fort Erie, Ontario.

History

The Bisons played at the newly constructed Memorial Auditorium, and at various times had affiliations with the Montreal Canadiens, Chicago Black Hawks and New York Rangers. The team was brought to Buffalo from Syracuse by Louis M. Jacobs, then owner of the Buffalo based Sportservice and the father of Jeremy Jacobs the current owner of the Boston Bruins. In 1955, Jacobs sold the team to the Chicago Black Hawks owner Arthur Wirtz and used Buffalo as its top farm team. However, a struggle occurred and Chicago threatened to move the team out of Western New York. Local bottling owners in the Pastor Brothers bought the team. 

The team's unusual logo stems from the Bisons being purchased in 1956 by the owner of the local franchise of Pepsi-Cola Ruby Pastor, who changed the team's colors and logo to reflect the soft drink company; the Bisons retained the logo for the rest of their existence.

They were Calder Cup champions in 1943, 1944, 1946, 1963 and 1970, and runners-up in 1948, 1951, 1955, 1959 and 1962.

The team ceased operations after the 1969–70 season due to the awarding of a National Hockey League expansion team, the Buffalo Sabres, to begin play in 1970–71. Like the Pittsburgh Hornets three years earlier (also shut down because of NHL expansion), the Bisons closed out their existence with one final championship.

Broadcaster Rick Jeanneret called several games during the Bisons' final season and moved into a similar role with the Sabres in 1971.

After the Bisons folded, the Sabres were granted an AHL franchise, which was used to establish the Cincinnati Swords in 1971. The Sabres used old Bisons jerseys in the team's first training camp in 1970. However the Swords is not a continuation of the Bisons as the team folded and the AHL granted Cincinnati a new team.

After the Bisons

On September 18, 2010, the Sabres announced that they would be adopting a third jersey that pays homage to the Bisons during their 2010–11 season. The Bisons-inspired third jersey was used for that and the following season before being discontinued. Elements from the Bisons-inspired throwbacks were incorporated into the Sabres' 2018 NHL Winter Classic jerseys. Those jerseys also became partly inspired by the Sabres new kits in 2020 along with elements used from the Sabres jerseys from 1970 to 1996.

Season-by-season results

Regular season

Playoffs

References

External links
Buffalo Bisons History
Buffalo Bisons - HockeyDB.com

 
1940 establishments in New York (state)
1970 disestablishments in New York (state)
Ice hockey clubs disestablished in 1970
Ice hockey clubs established in 1940
Sports in Buffalo, New York